The Lost City is a 1920 silent film serial directed by E.A. Martin. The film was distributed by Warner Bros. Pictures.

Cast
Juanita Hansen as Zoolah/Princess Elyata of Tarik
George Chesebro as Stanley Morton
Frank Clark as Michael Donovan
Irene Wallace
Hector Dion as Gagga

Chapter titles
The Lost Princess
The City of Hanging Gourds
The Flaming Tower
Jungle Death
The Puma's Victim
The Man-Eater's Prey
The Bride of Death
A Tragedy in the Sky
In the Palace of Black Walls
The Tug of War
In the Lion's Jaw
The Jungle Fire
In the Cave of Eternal Fire
Eagle's Nest
The Lost City

References

External links
 

American silent serial films
American black-and-white films
American adventure drama films
1920s adventure drama films
1920 films
1920s American films
Silent American drama films
Silent adventure films